The Phantom Broadcast is a 1933 American mystery film directed by Phil Rosen and starring Ralph Forbes, Vivienne Osborne and Gail Patrick. It was based on a story by Tristram Tupper entitled Phantom of the Air.

An arrogant singing radio performer is murdered, apparently by his accompanist who provided the real voice behind his success.

Cast
 Ralph Forbes as Norman Wilder  
 Vivienne Osborne as Elsa Evans  
 Arnold Gray as Grant Murdock  
 Gail Patrick as Laura Hamilton  
 Paul Page as Dr. Robert Brooks  
 Pauline Garon as Nancy  
 Guinn 'Big Boy' Williams as Sandy Higgins  
 Rockliffe Fellowes as Joe Maestro  
 Harland Tucker as Program Manager 
 Carl Miller as Lefty  
 Mary MacLaren as Beth  
 George Nash as Artist 
 Althea Henley as Model  
 George 'Gabby' Hayes as Police Lieutenant 
 Louise Beavers as Penny  
 Kit Guard as Thug  
 Henry Hall as Thornton - Radio Station Manager 
 Dick Rush as Policeman

References

Bibliography
 Bradley, Edwin M. Unsung Hollywood Musicals of the Golden Era: 50 Overlooked Films and Their Stars, 1929–1939. McFarland, 2016.

External links
 

1933 films
1933 mystery films
American mystery films
Films directed by Phil Rosen
Monogram Pictures films
American black-and-white films
1930s English-language films
1930s American films